Eugène Eudes-Deslongchamps (10 March 1830 – 21 December 1889) was a French paleontologist and naturalist born in Caen, the son of paleontologist Jacques Amand Eudes-Deslongchamps (1794–1867). He died at Château Matthieu, Calvados.

Around 1856 he succeeded his father as professor of zoology at the faculty of sciences at the University of Caen, later becoming a professor of geology and dean (1861). After the death of his father in 1867, he devoted himself to the completion of a memoir on the teleosaurs, the joint labours being embodied in his Prodrome des Téléosauriens du Calvados. He contributed several of his memoirs to the Société Linnéenne de Normandie.

Selected writings 
 Mémoire sur les genres Leptaena et Thecidea des terrains jurassiques du Calvados, (1853–59) – Memoir on the genera Leptaena and Thecidea in the Jurassic strata of Calvados.
 Mémoire sur les fossiles de Montreuil-Bellay (Maine-et-Loire), (1860 with M Hébert) – Memoir on fossils of Montreuil-Bellay (Maine-et-Loire).
 Etudes sur les étages jurassiques inférieurs de la Normandie, (1864) – Studies on the lower Jurassic strata of Normandy.
 Documents sur la géologie de la Nouvelle-Calédonie, (1864) – Documents on the geology of New Caledonia.
 Recherches sur l'organisation du manteau chez les Brachipodes articule´s et principalement sur les spicules calcaires contenus dans son interieur, (1864) – Research on the organization of the mantle in articulated brachiopods, mainly on calcareous spicules, etc.
 Notes sur les Téléosauriens, (1867) – Notes on Teleosauridae.
 Le Jura normand. Études paléontologiques des divers niveaux jurassiques de la Normandie, comprenant la description et l'iconographie de tous les fossiles vertébrés et invertébrés qu'ils renfement, (1877) – The Jura Normand. Paleontological studies of various Jurassic layers in Normandy, including descriptions and illustrations of fossil vertebrates and invertebrates.

Notes

References 
 IDREF.fr (list of publications)

External links
 

Academic staff of the University of Caen Normandy
Scientists from Caen
French paleontologists
French naturalists
1830 births
1889 deaths